Muhammad Bashar Kiwan (born November 30, 1966), known as Bachar Kiwan, is a Syrian-French convicted felon, fraudster and international fugitive. He is sought by the authorities in the Comoros Islands for criminal convictions relating to money laundering, fraud, and embezzlement in connection with the Comoros passport sales scandal and in Kuwait for criminal convictions relating to various white collar crimes including criminal fraud, forgery and bribery. He is a former businessman, having founded and invested in companies in the media and advertising industry operating in the Arab world, including Al-Waseet International Company. He previously held the positions of chairman of the Syrian Business Council in Kuwait, Honorary Consul of Comoros for Kuwait, and was a member of the Syrian-Iranian Business Council.

Early life and education 
Muhammad Bashar Kiwan was born in 1966 to Syrian parents and grew up in Kuwait. He received a master's degree in economics from the University of Montpellier in France and speaks fluent Arabic, French and English.

Career 
In 1992, he founded Al-Waseet, a classified advertising newspaper in Kuwait, with local business partners. Al-Waseet  grew from a classified advertising weekly publication in Kuwait to having operations in Jordan, United Arab Emirates, Bahrain, Qatar, Oman, Lebanon and Egypt, as well as editions of it under the name of Al Wasila in Saudi Arabia and Syria.

He is a founding partner in United Group for Publishing Advertising and Marketing, also known as United Group (UG), with his business partner Majd Bahjat Suleiman (son of Syrian Major General Bahjat Suleiman). Regarded as the media arm of the Assad regime in various Arab countries, United Group (UG) publishes the government-aligned Baladna newspaper in Syria, and published the defunct Al-Balad newspaper in Lebanon, Kuwait, and the Comoros. Kiwan and Suleiman grew their partnership with the establishment of several affiliated businesses in the fields of banking, construction, tourism, advertising and publishing, taking on local business partners in various countries. Their businesses include Al Waseet International, AWI Holding Limited, Comoro Gulf Holdings (CGH), Comoro Gulf Aviation, Dagher and Kiwan General Trading, and Jad & Jana (France).

In the Comoros, United Group (UG) affiliate Comoro Gulf Holdings (CGH) worked closely with former Comorian president Ahmed Abdallah Mohamed Sambi, and "monopolized investment and development on the islands." CGH's holdings included the Comoros United Company for Publishing and Distributing, which published the weekly newspaper Al-Waseet and a daily newspaper in Arabic and French, Al-Balad. CGH also established a local bank, the Banque Féderale De Commerce, in Comoros.

Kiwan and Suleiman also established AWI Company, also known as AWI Group, an affiliate of United Group (UG) based in Dubai Media City. AWI Company published a number of technical and advertising newspapers and magazines in 35 cities in 12 countries. The group publications included Layalina, Top Gear, Marie Claire, Fortune, and Concord Media for Road Advertisements. The group planned for an IPO in 2012 but stopped due to Syrian civil war.

Criminal activity

Comoros Islands 

Kiwan was the mastermind behind an economic citizenship program that he launched with his close associate, former Comorian president Abdullah Sambi. In 2018, Kiwan, two former Comoros presidents, and several other associates were criminally charged in relation to embezzlement of millions of euros diverted from this program to Kiwan and his associates.

Thousands of passports had been sold outside of official channels by 'mafia networks', of which hundreds were sold to Iranians, prompting fears amongst Western and Gulf allies that the passports were being used to skirt sanctions.

From 21 to 24 November 2022, Kiwan was tried for embezzlement and money laundering of Comorian public funds allegedly diverted from the economic citizenship program. On 28 November 2022, Bashar Kiwan was found guilty of criminal fraud, money laundering, and embezzlement of Comorian public funds. He was sentenced in to 10 years in jail.

Abu Dhabi 
Kiwan has reportedly been arrested and investigated in the UAE for fraud related to a telecom license he obtained in the Comoros. Unconfirmed reports suggest that Emirati tycoon Talal Al-Khoury invested US$34 million in the deal, but claims Kiwan defrauded him, embezzled the money for other uses, and sold the license to another operator.

Iranian and Syrian regime links 
Bashar Kiwan was a member of the Syrian-Iranian Business Council (SIBC) and served as an intermediary for the Iranian regime to purchase real estate in Syria alongside his close business associate Mazen Al Tarazi. In March 2019, Mazen Al Tarazi was arrested in Kuwait and charged with money laundering.

The Arab Center for Research and Policy Studies identified Bashar Kiwan as part of a network of Syrians residing abroad who accomplished for the Assad regime functions of a dual nature, mainly in the financial and military sphere.

Personal life 
Kiwan is married to French national Angelique Tournoud Kiwan, who he met on a ski trip in college. The couple has one son, Jad Kiwan. Angelique Tournoud co-founded fashion accessory brand LE MARAIS 101 with Zina Khair, the wife of Bashar Kiwan's business partner Majd Suleiman.

See also 

 Comoros passport sales scheme
 Majd Bahjat Suleiman
 United Group (UG)

References 

Syrian chief executives
Syrian businesspeople
People named in the Panama Papers
1966 births
Fugitives
Fugitives wanted by Egypt
Living people
People named in the Paradise Papers
Fugitives wanted by Kuwait
Syrian money launderers
Syrian criminals
Syrian white-collar criminals